The 1996 San Diego Chargers season was the franchise's 37th, its 27th in the National Football League (NFL), and its 34th in San Diego.

The season began with the team trying to improve on their 9–7 record in 1995. The Chargers fell back by one game and missed the playoffs by that margin. It was Bobby Ross's final season as the team's head coach, as he left due to "philosophical differences" with general manager Bobby Beathard. He had posted a 47–33 record over five seasons, going 3–3 in the playoffs.

Natrone Means had been let go following his injury the previous season. In his place, San Diego tried a running-back-by-committee approach featuring Leonard Russell, Aaron Hayden and Terrell Fletcher. This yielded 186 rushing yards in week one, but only four further 100-yard games throughout the season. Hayden was seldom used as the year went on - Russell managed 713 yards and 7 touchdowns, but the Chargers' average of 3.2 yards per rush was the league's worst. Changes on the offensive line may have contributed: veteran tackle Stan Brock retired during the offseason, and center Courtney Hall suffered a career- ending injury mid-season.

Tony Martin continued to be the star receiver, catching 85 passes for 1171 yards. He managed 14 touchdowns, joint-most in the NFL, and tying Lance Alworth's club record. Ronnie Harmon was replaced as a pass-catching back by Terrell Fletcher, who caught only two fewer passes (61), but for 197 fewer yards (476). Stan Humphries was again the starting quarterback, but continued to sustain frequent injuries and missed three games.

With six time Pro Bowl defensive end Leslie O'Neal having left after a decade with the club, Junior Seau stepped up to be the club leader in both sacks and tackles (7.0 and 138 respectively). He also contributed two interceptions, forced one fumble and recovered three. Rodney Harrison continued to improve, leading the team with five interceptions and coming second to Seau with 125 tackles. Darren Bennett averaged 45.6 yards per punt, third best in the league.

For the second consecutive year, the Chargers suffered an offseason tragedy. Running back Rodney Culver was among the 110 victims of  ValuJet Flight 592.

Offseason

NFL Draft

Personnel

Staff

Roster

Regular season

Schedule 

Note: Intra-division opponents are in bold text.

Game summaries

Week 1 

Touchdowns by Tony Martin and Leonard Russell, plus five field goals by John Carney saw the Chargers to an easy win on opening day. The running attack gave what was to prove its strongest showing, with Leonard Russell, Aaron Hayden and Terrell Fletcher splitting the carries, and each contributing to a team total of 186 yards (the Chargers would gain 100+ yards on the ground only four more times all year). When the Seahawks tried to play catch-up in the second half, San Diego's defense capitalised with four turnovers.

Week 2 

The Chargers started strongly, going 76 and 71 yards on consecutive drives capped by touchdowns for Russell and Martin. However, the Bengals came back into it before halftime when Carl Pickens scored; Humphries then threw an interception with San Diego poised to respond. Up 17-7 through three-quarters, the Chargers then got two big plays to put the game away. Firstly, Darrien Gordon's 64-yard punt return set up a short field goal; on the Bengals' next play from scrimmage Kurt Gouveia intercepted Jeff Blake, and Russell soon punched it in from the one.

Week 3 

The Chargers were brought back down to Earth, as the eventual Super Bowl champions dominated in all phases of the game. Edgar Bennett scored on the Packers' opening drive, and Brett Favre followed up with 3 touchdown passes as Green Bay built a 28–3 lead through three-quarters. San Diego then had a brief revival, with Willie Clark recovering a Favre fumble to set up a Humphries-to-Martin TD pass, and Lewis Bush recovering a Bennett fumble in Packers' territory on the next play. However, LeRoy Butler ended the threat with an interception and 90-yard touchdown return, and there was still time for Desmond Howard to add a special teams touchdown on a 65-yard punt return.

This was San Diego's heaviest loss since a 48-10 reverse against San Francisco eight seasons earlier.

Week 4 

San Diego bounced back with victory in a back-and-forth shootout. The Chargers broke the game open late in the 1st quarter when Stan Humphries threw touchdown on three consecutive pass attempts. Firstly, a 35-yard punt return by Darrien Gordon set up a 27-yard scoring drive, with Humphries finding Terrell Fletcher to open the scoring. Kurt Gouveia intercepted Jeff Hostetler's next pass, leading to an even shorter drive, with Martin scoring the Chargers' second touchdown. Shortly afterwards, Rodney Harrison's fumble recovery was followed immediately by another Humphries-to-Martin score, from 41 yards out. The three touchdowns came within a span of only 3:05.

Hostetler then led a Raider comeback, throwing three touchdowns during the 2nd and 3rd quarters, while the Chargers could only manage a pair of Carney kicks. Down only 27–21, Oakland drive inside the San Diego 10, but the drive stalled and Cole Ford missed a 25-yard field goal as the 3rd quarter ended.

The Chargers then drove 80 yards the other way, Humphries finding Martin for another touchdown. Hostetler quickly drove back into scoring position, but Willie Clark intercepted his 4th down pass and ran it back 83 yards for a 40–21 lead with 3:40 to play. Oakland managed two quick touchdowns either side of an onside kick recovery, before Alfred Pupunu recovered a further onside attempt to clinch the win.

Humphries completed 18 of 25 passes for 226 yards, with a career-high four touchdowns and no interceptions. Martin had 10 receptions for 138 yards and three scores. San Diego set a club record for most yardage conceded in a win with 553; they managed only 321 themselves but won the turnover battle 3–0.

Week 5 

A pair of Junior Seau interceptions helped the Chargers past the previously undefeated Chiefs. In a battle of field goals, Seau's first pick led to Carney's second, and a 6–0 lead. However, a fumbled punt return by Darrien Gordon set up the first of three successes by Pete Stoyanovich in the 2nd quarter.

After Carney tied the game at 9–9 in the 3rd quarter, Gordon atoned for his earlier error with an 81-yard punt return touchdown. However, Marcus Allen's 59-yard reception on the next play from scrimmage set an immediate Chiefs' response. Following a further exchange of field goals, Seau intercepted Steve Bono for the second time, and Carney kicked the winner from 33 yards out with 3:17 to play. A Seau sack was then instrumental in forcing Kansas City to turn the ball over on downs, but Russell fumbled on the next play. Given a bonus chance, Bono led his team into field goal range, but Chris Mims blocked the game-tying attempt.

The nine successful field goals were a record (since surpassed). Following this result, Denver, San Diego and Kansas City were tied atop the AFC West with 4-1 records.

Week 6 

A collapse from 17-0 ahead cost San Diego victory in a pivotal game. Up 3–0 in the second quarter, Rodney Harrison's first interception of the season set up a short touchdown pass from Humphries to Terrell Fletcher; Humphries found Martin for another score shortly afterwards. John Elway responded immediately, leading his team 80 yards in just five plays, the last 20 coming on a 20-yard strike to Shannon Sharpe shortly before halftime.

In the 3rd quarter, the same pairing hooked up twice more, putting Denver four points ahead. San Diego tried to respond, but Humphries threw incomplete on 4th and 7 at the Broncos' 38, and Elway soon put the game away with his fourth touchdown pass, this time to Ed McCaffrey. This result put Denver alone atop the AFC West, and they wouldn't lose again until after they'd clinched home field advantage through the playoffs.

Week 8 

San Diego lost both the game and their starting QB on Monday Night Football. With his side down 7–0 in the 1st quarter, Humphries was hit by Chester McGlockton at the end of a 5-yard scramble and dislocated his left shoulder; backup Sean Salisbury came in and finished the drive with an 11-yard touchdown pass to Martin. Salisbury later fumbled while being sacked by McGlockton in Raider territory, and Oakland kicked a field goal for a 20–7 lead; San Diego bounced back quickly, with Salisbury and Martin hooking up from 12 yards out to pull it back to 20–14. However, Darrien Gordon muffed a punt in the final four minutes, and Oakland hit the clinching field goal.

Salisbury finished 22 of 35, for 235 yards, two touchdowns and one interception.

Week 9 

San Diego's five-game winning streak against the Seahawks came to an end in a one-sided encounter. The Chargers were missing their leaders on both sides of the ball, with Seau and Humphries out injured. Seattle running back Chris Warren took advantage of the former's absence with 146 yards and a touchdown, while Salisbury struggled in his first start, throwing four interceptions (one of those a pick six), against a single touchdown.

Week 10 

Five turnovers helped San Diego to a much-needed win. Colts' QB Jim Harbaugh was intercepted by four different players in the first half - he had thrown only two all season coming in - and the Chargers converted the errors into a Charlie Jones touchdown reception and a pair of field goals. These were the first in a sequence of eight fields, four by each team, culminating in a Colts 20-yarder that made it 19–12; Indianapolis almost had a touchdown before that last kick, but punter Darren Bennett brought down Ray Buchanan at the nine after an 82-yard return.

Indianapolis were driving at the start of the 4th quarter, but Junior Seau sacked Harbaugh, causing a fumble which Chris Mims recovered. Tony Martin doubled the lead six plays later. The Colts then embarked on a 17 play drive, but turned the ball over on downs after having 1st and goal at the one. They did score on their next drive, but San Diego then picked up a pair of 1st downs to kill all but five seconds of the clock.

Sean Salisbury was much improved, going 19 of 31 for 237 yards and two touchdowns. Martin had 128 yards on just 6 receptions. San Diego committed 15 penalties (a club record at the time) for 135 yards.

Week 11 

Stan Humphries had a successful return to the starting lineup, and San Diego overcame another slew of penalties to win their second straight. After Humphries found Martin for a 32-yard touchdown on 2nd and 24, Barry Sanders scored touchdowns on consecutive drives to put Detroit ahead. The Lions led 14–10 on the stroke of halftime, but Humphries lofted a high pass into the end zone as the clock ran out, which eluded several Detroit defenders and nestled in the arms of Andre Coleman for a 46-yard touchdown. It was the second time Humphries had completed a Hail Mary pass on Monday Night Football, having done the same against Miami three seasons earlier.

San Diego carried their momentum on into the second half, where Alfred Pupunu caught a touchdown on their first drive, and Carney kick a field goal on their second. Carney had the chance to make the game almost safe with 5 minutes to play, but missed a 49 yarder, and Don Majkowski led Detroit the other way for a touchdown. An onside kick recovery by Junior Seau allowed San Diego to run out all but 9 seconds of the clock.

Humphries went 24 of 32 for 311 yards, three touchdowns and no interceptions. Martin had 8 grabs for 113 yards and a score. Leonard Russell had his most productive day as a Charger, with 80 yards on the ground and a further 33 through the air. San Diego outgained Detroit 406–222, but were flagged for 129 yards on 11 penalties; on the three Lions touchdown drives, penalties outcounted for 35, 30 and 24 yards respectively.

Week 12 

San Diego suffered a shock defeat against the Buccaneers, who were 2-8 coming in, had lost ten consecutive road games, and had zero wins against the Chargers from six previous attempts.

The game started well for San Diego, with Charlie Jones turning a short crossing pattern into a 63-yard touchdown only three plays in. After Tampa Bay missed a short field goal, the Chargers recovered a muffed punt and scored via Russell a play later. The Buccaneers pulled it back to 14–10 over their next two drives, then began to miss numerous chances: Trent Dilfer was stuffed attempting a QB sneak on 4th and 1 from the San Diego 30; Alvin Harper dropped a pass in the end zone, forcing his team to settle for a field goal as the first half ended; following a Humphries interception, Dilfer was sacked by Chris Mims on 1st and 10 from the Charger 17, and Reuben Davis recovered; following a San Diego field goal, the Buccaneers executed a fake punt and reached 1st and 5 from the Charger 20, but Dilfer threw it straight to Rodney Harrison in the end zone.

In the 4th quarter, Tampa Bay finally turned their superiority into points, with two more Humphries interceptions leading to 9 points. A further field goal made it 25–17 with 2:11 to play. San Diego made it as far as the Tampa 30 in response, but Humphries threw three incompletions as time expired.

Week 13 

A surprising road win balanced out the home upset from a week earlier. Kansas City were 8-3 coming in, but San Diego completed the sweep with more ease than the final scoreline suggested. After Martin had opened the scoring, Kansas City reached a 3rd and 5 at the Charger 20, but Harrison intercepted Steve Bono, and San Diego drove 97 yards the other way to a Russell touchdown. Another TD reception by Martin made it 21–0 at halftime.

There was a repeat performance in the 3rd quarter; Harrison again intercepted Bono, and the Chargers again converted the turnover into a Russell score. Rich Gannon replaced Bono late in the 3rd quarter and led his team on a pair of touchdown drives, but they came too late to seriously threaten a comeback.

Martin caught five passes in the game: they covered 29, 20, 34, 10 and 55 yards respectively, the two shortest receptions being touchdowns. With a 7–5 record, San Diego were positioned as the 3rd wild card in the playoff race.

Week 14 

A home thrashing derailed the Chargers' playoff push. The Patriots scored touchdowns on their first two drives, before Stan Humphries found Tony Martin from 46 yards out to halve the deficit. Little went right for the Chargers thereafter, with six turnovers, including a pair of fumbles that were returned for touchdowns. Patriots' QB Drew Bledsoe threw four touchdowns, the last of these to former Charger Shawn Jefferson, and Humphries was knocked out of the game in the 3rd quarter with a concussion.

Tony Martin's score was the lone bright spot for San Diego. It was his 14th of the season, tying Lance Alworth's club record. However, Martin failed to score in the remaining three games, so the record remained unbroken. Taken together with their Week 3 loss in Green Bay, San Diego were outscored 87-17 by the eventual participants of Super Bowl XXXI.

Week 15 

An anemic offensive performance saw the Chargers lose a scrappy game, in which both teams committed four turnovers. Two of these occurred on the same play: Darrien Gordon intercepted a tipped ball, but was hit by teammate Terrence Shaw and fumbled. The Steelers converted that error into a field goal, and led 13–0 at the break.

The Chargers offense, which once again had Salisbury in as starting QB, had mustered few threats to that point, but managed to get inside the Pittsburgh 10 before settling for a field goal. However, Salisbury fumbled while being sacked on the next possession, and the Steelers responded in kind. A 50-yard catch by Andre Coleman helped San Diego reach 3rd and 2 at the five yard line on their next possession, but Russell fumbled the chance away. A 55-yard interception return by Gordon set up one more chance, but Salisbury was sacked twice and the Chargers turned it over on downs.

Week 16 

The Chargers suffered a third straight loss, and were soon eliminated from the playoff race. They started brightly, Humphries finding Russell for 35 yards on the game's opening play, and Coleman for a touchdown four plays later. After a pair of Bears touchdowns, Russell tied the scores from a yard out. On the next San Diego drive, Carney missed a 48-yard field goal, and the teams were still level at halftime. Carney also hit the upright from only 26 yards out in the second half, as the Bears pulled away.

Seau twice sacked Dave Kreig, bring his season tally to 7.0, which matched his career high. San Diego were officially eliminated from playoff contention the next day, when Indianapolis won at Kansas City.

Week 17 

San Diego won a low-key final game to finish at 8-8. With Denver locked into the #1 seed, neither side had much to play for. John Elway started the game, and had his side up 10-0 before losing a fumble which Seau recovered, setting up a Humphries-to-Jones touchdown pass. After Elway was pulled, Seau recovered another fumble to set up the first of thee Carney field goals. With Terrell Davis soon joining his quarterback on the sidelines, the Denver offense was led by backups, and could generate no further points; Rodney Harrison foiled their best chance with an end zone interception.

The result meant that Bobby Ross left San Diego as the first Charger head coach to post no losing records during his tenure.

Standings

References

External links 
 1996 San Diego Chargers at Pro-Football-Reference.com

San Diego Chargers
San Diego Chargers seasons
San Diego Chargers f